Wainwrights are the 214 English peaks (known locally as fells) described in Alfred Wainwright's seven-volume Pictorial Guide to the Lakeland Fells (1955–66). Over two million copies of the Pictorial Guides have been sold since their publication. In 1974, Wainwright published a supplementary volume The Outlying Fells of Lakeland (1974), which includes another 116 summits (described in 56 walks); these are the Wainwright Outlying Fells.

Summiting all of the Wainwrights is a popular form of peak bagging in the Lake District, along with the Birketts. Because both lists are based on historical books, unlike, for example, the Munros, their constituents remain fixed, regardless of revisions to height or other metrics. In this regard, they are similar to the Scottish lowlands, Donalds. There are 214 Wainwrights, of which 209 are also classed as one of the 541 Birketts. Wainwright did not state any rules about what should be included in his guides, choosing instead to note his walks according to his favour and their relevance in the landscape, never himself considering the summiting of all of them to be an important accomplishment for others.

The Long Distance Walkers Association ("LDWA") holds a register of walkers who wish it to be recorded that they have completed the Wainwrights.  The first recorded continuous round of all 214 Wainwrights was completed by Alan Heaton between 29 June and 8 July 1985 starting and finishing at Keswick Moot Hall, with a total time of 9 days and 16 hours. Joss Naylor completed the round in 7 days in 1986 and held the record until 20 June 2014 when Steve Birkinshaw completed the round in 6 days and 13 hours, involving 320 miles (515 km) and 118,000 ft (36,000m) of ascent. Birkinshaw published an account of his run as There is No Map in Hell: The Record-Breaking Run Across the Lake District Fells (2017,). Birkinshaw's record was broken on 20 June 2019 when Paul Tierney completed the round in 6 days 6 hours 4  minutes. On 12 to 17 June 2021, Sabrina Verjee set a new record of 5 days, 23 hours and 49 minutes. The current record was set by John Kelly on 2 to 7 May 2022 with a time of 5 days, 12 hours and 14 minutes.

Following the same route, on 26 August 2021, a team of 27 members of Durham Fell Runners, began what is thought to be the first attempt at a continuous relay of the 214 Wainwright Fells.  Running through the night and day, the team completed the round in a time of 4 days, 6 hours and 50 minutes.

Wainwrights by height

This list is from the Database of British and Irish Hills ("DoBIH") in October 2018, and are peaks the DoBIH marks as being Wainwrights ("W").  DoBIH also updates the measurements as surveys are recorded, so these tables should not be amended unless the entire DoBIH data is re-downloaded; these measurements may differ slightly from the "By Book" section, which are from older sources.

Wainwright Outlying Fells by height

This list is from the Database of British and Irish Hills ("DoBIH") in October 2018, and are peaks the DoBIH marks as being Wainwright Outlying Fells ("WO"). DoBIH also updates the measurements as surveys are recorded, so these tables should not be amended unless the entire DoBIH data is re-downloaded; these measurements may differ slightly from the "By Book" section, which are from older sources.

Wainwrights by book

Book One: The Eastern Fells

The Eastern Fells are centred around Helvellyn and primarily consist of a north-south ridge running between Ullswater and Lakeland's Central Valley.

Helvellyn, 950 m (3,117 ft)
Nethermost Pike, 891 m (2,923 ft)
Catstycam, 890 m (2,920 ft)
Raise, 883 m (2,897 ft)
Fairfield, 873 m (2,864 ft)
White Side, 863 m (2,831 ft)
Dollywaggon Pike, 858 m (2,815 ft)
Great Dodd, 857 m (2,812 ft)
Stybarrow Dodd, 843 m (2,766 ft)
St Sunday Crag, 841 m (2,759 ft)
Hart Crag, 822 m (2,697 ft)
Dove Crag, 792 m (2,598 ft)
Watson's Dodd, 789 m (2,589 ft)
Red Screes, 776 m (2,546 ft)
Great Rigg, 766 m (2,513 ft)
Hart Side, 756 m (2,480 ft)
Seat Sandal, 736 m (2,415 ft)
Clough Head, 726 m (2,382 ft)
Birkhouse Moor, 718 m (2,356 ft)
Sheffield Pike, 675 m (2,215 ft)
High Pike, 656 m (2,152 ft)
Middle Dodd, 654 m (2,146 ft)
Little Hart Crag, 637 m (2,090 ft)
Birks, 622 m (2,041 ft)
Heron Pike, 612 m (2,008 ft)
Hartsop above How, 570 m (1,870 ft)
Great Mell Fell, 537 m (1,762 ft)
High Hartsop Dodd, 519 m (1,703 ft)
Low Pike, 508 m (1,667 ft)
Little Mell Fell, 505 m (1,657 ft)
Stone Arthur, 500 m (1,640 ft) [Actually #33 on map]
Gowbarrow Fell, 481 m (1,578 ft) [Actually #32 on map]
Nab Scar, 450 m (1,476 ft)
Glenridding Dodd, 442 m (1,450 ft)
Arnison Crag, 433 m (1,421 ft)

Book Two: The Far Eastern Fells

The Far Eastern Fells occupy a broad area to the east of Ullswater, Kirkstone Pass and are bordered by the M6 motorway.

High Street, 828 m (2,717 ft)
High Raise, 802 m (2,631 ft)
Rampsgill Head, 792 m (2,598 ft)
Thornthwaite Crag, 784 m (2,572 ft)
Kidsty Pike, 780 m (2,559 ft)
Harter Fell, 778 m (2,552 ft)
Caudale Moor, 763 m (2,503 ft)
Mardale Ill Bell, 760 m (2,493 ft)
Ill Bell, 757 m (2,484 ft)
The Knott, 739 m (2,425 ft)
Kentmere Pike, 730 m (2,395 ft)
Froswick, 720 m (2,362 ft)
Branstree, 713 m (2,339 ft)
Yoke, 706 m (2,316 ft)
Gray Crag, 699 m (2,293 ft)
Rest Dodd, 696 m (2,283 ft)
Loadpot Hill, 671 m (2,201 ft)
Wether Hill, 670 m (2,198 ft)
Tarn Crag, 664 m (2,178 ft)
Place Fell, 657 m (2,156 ft)
Selside Pike, 655 m (2,149 ft)
Grey Crag, 638 m (2,093 ft)
Hartsop Dodd, 618 m (2,028 ft)
Shipman Knotts, 587 m (1,926 ft)
The Nab, 576 m (1,890 ft)
Angletarn Pikes, 567 m (1,860 ft)
Brock Crags, 561 m (1,841 ft)
Arthur's Pike, 533 m (1,749 ft)
Bonscale Pike, 524 m (1,719 ft)
Sallows, 516 m (1,693 ft)
Beda Fell, 509 m (1,670 ft)
Wansfell, 488 m (1,601 ft)
Sour Howes, 483 m (1,585 ft)
Steel Knotts, 432 m (1,417 ft)
Hallin Fell, 388 m (1,273 ft)
Troutbeck Tongue, 364 m (1,194 ft)

Book Three: The Central Fells

The Central Fells are situated in the heart of the Lake District, surrounded by the other ranges. The range extends from the ridge between Derwentwater and Thirlmere in the north, to the famous rock peaks of the Langdale Pikes in the south.

High Raise, 762 m (2,500 ft)
Sergeant Man, 736 m (2,415 ft)
Harrison Stickle, 736 m (2,415 ft)
Ullscarf, 726 m (2,382 ft)
Thunacar Knott, 723 m (2,372 ft)
Pike of Stickle, 709 m (2,326 ft)
Pavey Ark, 700 m (2,297 ft)
Loft Crag, 680 m (2,231 ft)
High Seat, 608 m (1,995 ft)
Bleaberry Fell, 590 m (1,936 ft)
Sergeant's Crag, 571 m (1,873 ft)
Steel Fell, 553 m (1,814 ft)
Tarn Crag, 550 m (1,804 ft)
Blea Rigg, 541 m (1,775 ft)
Calf Crag, 537 m (1,762 ft)
High Tove, 515 m (1,690 ft)
Eagle Crag, 525 m (1,722 ft)
Armboth Fell, 479 m (1,572 ft)
Raven Crag, 461 m (1,512 ft)
Great Crag, 450 m (1,476 ft)
Gibson Knott, 420 m (1,378 ft)
Grange Fell, 415 m (1,362 ft)
Helm Crag, 
Silver How, 395 m (1,296 ft)
Walla Crag, 376 m (1,234 ft)
High Rigg, 357 m (1,171 ft)
Loughrigg Fell, 335 m (1,099 ft)

Book Four: The Southern Fells

The Southern Fells occupy a large area to the south of Great Langdale, Borrowdale, Wasdale and include Scafell Pike, the highest peak in England. 

Scafell Pike, 978 m (3,209 ft) 
Sca Fell, 964 m (3,163 ft)
Great End, 910 m (2,986 ft)
Bowfell, 902 m (2,959 ft)
Esk Pike, 885 m (2,904 ft)
Crinkle Crags, 859 m (2,818 ft)
Lingmell, 807 m (2,648 ft)
Coniston Old Man, 803 m (2,635 ft)
Swirl How, 802 m (2,631 ft)
Brim Fell, 796 m (2,612 ft)
Great Carrs, 785 m (2,575 ft)
Allen Crags, 785 m (2,575 ft)
Glaramara, 783 m (2,569 ft)
Dow Crag, 778 m (2,552 ft)
Grey Friar, 773 m (2,536 ft)
Wetherlam, 763 m (2,503 ft)
Slight Side, 762 m (2,500 ft)
Pike o' Blisco, 709 m (2,326 ft)
Cold Pike, 701 m (2,300 ft)
Harter Fell, 654 m (2,146 ft)
Rossett Pike, 651 m (2,136 ft)
Illgill Head, 609 m (1,998 ft)
Seathwaite Fell, 601 m (1,972 ft)
Rosthwaite Fell, 551 m (1,808 ft)
Hard Knott, 549 m (1,801 ft)
Whin Rigg, 535 m (1,755 ft)
Green Crag, 489 m (1,604 ft)
Lingmoor Fell, 469 m (1,539 ft)
Black Fell, 323 m (1,060 ft)
Holme Fell, 317 m (1,040 ft)

Book Five: The Northern Fells

The Northern Fells cover a circular area north of Keswick. The range is bordered to the west by Bassenthwaite Lake, the River Greta in the south and Caldew river bounds the eastern edge of the group, flowing away toward Carlisle. It is the smallest group by total number of hills.

Skiddaw, 931 m (3,054 ft)
Blencathra, 868 m (2,848 ft)
Skiddaw Little Man, 865 m (2,838 ft)
Carl Side, 746 m (2,448 ft)
Long Side, 734 m (2,408 ft)
Lonscale Fell, 715 m (2,346 ft)
Knott, 710 m (2,329 ft)
Bowscale Fell, 702 m (2,303 ft)
Great Calva, 690 m (2,264 ft)
Ullock Pike, 690 m (2,264 ft)
Bannerdale Crags, 683 m (2,241 ft)
Bakestall, 673 m (2,208 ft)
Carrock Fell, 663 m (2,175 ft)
High Pike, 658 m (2,159 ft)
Great Sca Fell, 651 m (2,136 ft)
Mungrisdale Common, 633 m (2,077 ft)
Brae Fell, 586 m (1,923 ft)
Meal Fell, 550 m (1,804 ft)
Great Cockup, 526 m (1,726 ft)
Souther Fell, 522 m (1,713 ft)
Dodd, 502 m (1,647 ft)
Longlands Fell, 483 m (1,585 ft)
Binsey, 447 m (1,467 ft)
Latrigg, 367 m (1,204 ft)

Book Six: The North Western Fells

The North Western Fells occupy an oval area beneath the Buttermere and Borrowdale valley systems.

Grasmoor, 852 m (2,795 ft)
Eel Crag (Crag Hill), 839 m (2,753 ft)
Grisedale Pike, 791 m (2,595 ft)
Sail, 773 m (2,536 ft)
Wandope, 772 m (2,533 ft)
Hopegill Head, 770 m (2,526 ft)
Dale Head, 753 m (2,470 ft)
Robinson, 737 m (2,418 ft)
Hindscarth, 727 m (2,385 ft)
Whiteside, 707 m (2,320 ft)
Scar Crags, 672 m (2,205 ft)
Whiteless Pike, 660 m (2,165 ft)
High Spy, 653 m (2,142 ft)
Causey Pike, 637 m (2,090 ft)
Maiden Moor, 575 m (1,886 ft)
Ard Crags, 581 m (1,906 ft)
Outerside, 568 m (1,864 ft)
Knott Rigg, 556 m (1,824 ft)
Lord's Seat, 552 m (1,811 ft)
Whinlatter, 517 m (1,696 ft)
Broom Fell, 511 m (1,677 ft)
Barf, 468 m (1,535 ft)
Barrow, 455 m (1,493 ft)
Graystones, 452 m (1,483 ft)
Catbells, 451 m (1,480 ft)
Ling Fell, 373 m (1,224 ft)
Sale Fell, 359 m (1,178 ft)
Rannerdale Knotts, 355 m (1,165 ft)
Castle Crag, 298 m (978 ft)

Book Seven: The Western Fells

The Western Fells are centred around Great Gable and form a triangular area between Buttermere and Wasdale.

Great Gable, 899 m (2,949 ft)
Pillar, 892 m (2,927 ft)
Scoat Fell, 841 m (2,759 ft)
Red Pike (Wasdale), 826 m (2,709 ft)
Steeple, 819 m (2,687 ft)
High Stile, 807 m (2,648 ft)
Kirk Fell, 802 m (2,631 ft)
Green Gable, 801 m (2,628 ft)
Haycock, 797 m (2,614 ft)
Red Pike (Buttermere), 755 m (2,476 ft)
High Crag, 744 m (2,441 ft)
Brandreth, 715 m (2,345 ft)
Caw Fell, 697 m (2,288 ft)
Grey Knotts, 697 m (2,287 ft)
Seatallan, 692 m (2,270 ft)
Fleetwith Pike, 648 m (2,126 ft)
Base Brown, 646 m (2,119 ft)
Starling Dodd, 633 m (2,077 ft)
Yewbarrow, 628 m (2,060 ft)
Great Borne, 616 m (2,021 ft)
Haystacks, 597 m (1,958 ft)
Middle Fell, 582 m (1,909 ft)
Blake Fell, 573 m (1,880 ft)
Lank Rigg, 541 m (1,775 ft)
Gavel Fell, 526 m (1,725 ft)
Crag Fell, 523 m (1,715 ft)
Mellbreak, 512 m (1,680 ft)
Hen Comb, 509 m (1,670 ft)
Grike, 488 m (1,601 ft)
Burnbank Fell, 475 m (1,559 ft)
Low Fell, 423 m (1,388 ft)
Buckbarrow, 423 m (1,388 ft)
Fellbarrow, 416 m (1,365 ft)

Bibliography

DoBIH codes

The DoBIH uses the following codes for the various classifications of mountains and hills in the British Isles, which many of the above peaks also fall into:

suffixes:
=	twin

See also

Lists of mountains and hills in the British Isles
List of hill passes of the Lake District
The Outlying Fells of Lakeland
List of Birketts in the Lake District

Notes

References

External links
The Database of British and Irish Hills (DoBIH), the largest database of British Isles mountains
Hill Bagging UK & Ireland, the searchable interface for the DoBIH
Google Map of All Wainwrights
Map of all 214 Wainwrights by Height
Lake District Walks - Wainwright Fells 214
Alfred Wainwright Books & Memorabilia

Wainwrights

Wainwrights
Wainwrights